Kitsune Kon is an annual three-day anime convention held during July at the KI Convention Center in Green Bay, Wisconsin.

Programming
The convention typically offers arcade gaming, artists’ alley, a boffer (foam weapons) room, costume contest, dealers’ hall, formal dance, and gaming (console, table top, video). Its formal dance benefited the American Association for Cancer prevention in 2016.

History
Kitsune Kon moved to the KI Convention Center due to growth. Complaints about the 2017 convention included a lack of food options, shortage of staff, and issues with the local Green Bay population. Kitsune Kon 2020 was cancelled due to the COVID-19 pandemic. Kitsune Kon 2021 was also cancelled due to the COVID-19 pandemic.

Event history

References

External links
 Kitsune Kon Website

Anime conventions in the United States
Recurring events established in 2011
2011 establishments in Wisconsin
Annual events in Wisconsin
Wisconsin culture
Festivals in Wisconsin
Tourist attractions in Brown County, Wisconsin
Culture of Green Bay, Wisconsin
Conventions in Wisconsin